Chatswood Interchange (also known as The Interchange Chatswood or The Interchange) is a shopping centre in the suburb of Chatswood in the lower North Shore of Sydney and is integrated with the Chatswood railway station and features a Woolworths Metro supermarket, 70 speciality stores, three high-rise office towers and high-rise apartments.

Transport 
The Metro North West, North Shore & Western Line and Northern Line offer frequent services to Chatswood station.

Chatswood Interchange has bus connections to Sydney CBD, North Shore and Northern Sydney, as well as surrounding suburbs. It is served by Busways, Forest Coach Lines, Keolis Downer Northern Beaches and Transit Systems with bus stops on either side of the railway line.

There is also parking in nearby streets and car parks.

History 
The Interchange opened in 1988 integrated with the station entrance. It featured around 30 speciality stores with no anchor stores.

With the construction of the Chatswood to Epping line, The Interchange as well as Chatswood railway station and its attached bus interchange was demolished in 2005. Construction started on new railway station, bus interchange and shopping centre in late 2005. The CTI was constructed as a Public Private Partnership and was to include a new shopping centre called 'Metro Chatswood' and three towers. The private developers, CRI Chatswood, went into receivership whilst construction was underway. As a result, the shopping centre remained vacant until 2014 and major construction of the towers was delayed for several years.

The centre opened in 2014 as Chatswood Interchange. Woolworths opened its 2000sqm store and its BWS chain opened on the ground level. Many kiosks have opened in stages and the post office has relocated there.

On March 28, 2015, The District food court opened on the top level, which included 14 vendors that offered Chinese, Japanese, Thai and Italian cuisine.

As a result, Chatswood Interchange is expected to reach $634 million by 2026 and can support trade for over 75,150 people.

References

External links 
Chatswood Interchange Official Website

Shopping centres in Sydney
Shopping malls established in 2014
2014 establishments in Australia